Stefano Parisi (Rome, 12 November 1956) is an Italian businessman and politician, General Secretary of Confindustria for 4 years and founder of Energies for Italy, a political party member of the centre-right coalition.

Biography

Origins and personal life
Parisi was born in Rome, but lives in Milan since 1997 with his wife and two daughters.

Career
In the 1970s during his studying he worked as a Vice-Secretary of the Socialist University's nucleus of his city. After graduating from the University Sapienza Università di Roma in Economics and Commerce, he began working at the CGIL study office, and always kept on a socialist level. In 1984 he became Head of the Technical Secretariat of the Ministry of Labor, the post he abandoned four years later. In 1988 he passed to the Vice-Presidency of the Council of Ministers during the De Mita government. In 1989 Parisi obtained the same office at the Ministry of Foreign Affairs with the minister Gianni De Michelis, of the Italian Socialist Party, and remained there until 1991. In 1992 he became the Head of the Department of Economic Affairs of the Presidency of the Council of Ministers. In 1994 Parisi was chosen as a Secretary General of the Ministry of Post and Telecommunications just established with the beginning of the mobile telephony market. 
Also in 1994 Parisi joined the RAI auditors' board and in 1996 he became a Head of the Information and Publishing Department of the Council Presidency. In 1997 he left both the RAI board of auditors and the Department of Economic Affairs of the Presidency of the Council of Ministers, working as a City Manager of Milan, whose mayor was Gabriele Albertini. In 2000 he left his post and assumed the position of General Manager of Confindustria during the presidency of Antonio D'Amato. In 2009 he became a President of Assotelecomunicazioni-Asstel, but the following year he left Swisscom, after being involved in the investigation for alleged international tax fraud with Silvio Scaglia being a President of Fastweb. In 2012 Parisi moved to the leadership of Chili Tv, a company that dealt with the distribution of films.

In 2016 Stefano Parisi ran for the post of a Mayor of Milan from the centre-right coalition supported by Matteo Salvini, Silvio Berlusconi, Maurizio Lupi and Gabriele Albertini: Parisi's opponent was Giuseppe Sala, representative of centre-left coalition. In June 2016 Parisi lost the Milan municipal election and Sala was elected a Mayor of the city of Milan. After his defeat Parisi founded Energie per l'Italia movement. In January 2018 Parisi became the candidate at the Presidency of Lazio in the 2018 regional election with the centre-right coalition; Stefano Parisi's principal opponents are the incumbent President Nicola Zingaretti (centre-left coalition), the out-going deputy Roberta Lombardi (Five Star Movement), the incumbent Mayor of Amatrice Sergio Pirozzi (supported by Gianni Alemanno and Francesco Storace) and the candidate of CasaPound Mauro Antonini. On 4 March 2018 Parisi lost the election with 31% and Parisi became regional councilor as official Leader of Opposition and first elect of his coalition because he arrived second in the electoral race of presidential candidates.

References

See also 
Giuseppe Sala
Milan municipal election, 2016
Nicola Zingaretti 
Lazio regional election, 2018

|-

Living people
1956 births